Loricaria tucumanensis is a species of catfish in the family Loricariidae. It is native to South America, where it occurs in the Dulce River basin in Argentina. The species reaches 12.1 cm (4.8 inches) in standard length and is believed to be a facultative air-breather.

References 

Loricariidae
Fish described in 1979
Catfish of South America
Fish of Argentina